The Edinburgh Encyclopædia is an encyclopaedia in 18 volumes, printed and published by William Blackwood and edited by David Brewster between 1808 and 1830. In competition with the Edinburgh-published Encyclopædia Britannica, the Edinburgh Encyclopædia is generally considered to be strongest on scientific topics, where many of the articles were written by the editor.

The Edinburgh Encyclopædia was originally planned to encompassed 12 volumes, but by the time the final volume was published, in 1830, it counted 18 volumes. Some subjects, such as the polarization of light and electromagnetism, had not even been heard of when the project began, and yet the Encyclopedia had articles on them. The electromagnetism article was even contributed by Hans Christian Ørsted, the founder of modern electromagnetic studies. It also included information on contemporary events such as Christopher Hansteen's 1829 expedition to Siberia.

In 1815 William Elford Leach published the first bibliography of entomology in Brewster's Edinburgh Encyclopædia (see Timeline of entomology – 1800–1850).

Joseph Parker of Philadelphia and Whiting & Watson of New York City printed American editions, both in 1832.

Contributors
A list of major contributors, with indications of their articles, was published in 1830.

Other contributors – "Gentlemen Eminent in Science and Literature" – included Adam Anderson, Charles Babbage, Thomas Carlyle, Robert Gordon, Robert Edmond Grant, John Leslie, Henry Liston, John Gibson Lockhart and Thomas Telford.

Thomas Allan
Adam Anderson
Alexander Annesley
Charles Babbage ("Notation", "Porisms")
Robert Bald
Alexander Balfour
John Barclay
Peter Barlow
James Bell
Jacob Berzelius
J. B. Biot
Philip Bliss
James Bonar
John Bostock
David Brewster
G. Brewster
James Brewster
Patrick Brewster
David Brown
Robert Brown
William Brown
H. R. Brown
David Buchanan
Robertson Buchanan
Rev. W. Burns
Robert Burns
Thomas Campbell
Archibald Campbell
Thomas Carlyle
Thomas Chalmers
James Cleland
John Clennel
John Colquhoun
John Davies
John Graham Dalyell
J. Denholm
David Dickson
Thomas Lauder Dick
Lieutenant-General Alexander Dirom
Henry Dewar
Archdeacon Drummond
Henry Duncan
John Duncan
Rev. Thomas Duncan
Thomas Duncan
George Dunbar
James Erskine
William Edgeworth
James Esdaile
John Farey, senior
John Farey, junior
Andrew Ferguson
Denis Ferral
John Fleming
James D. Forbes
Andrew Fyffe
William Galbraith
Thomas Galloway
Alexander Galloway; (wrote the "Perspective" article, and was an acquaintance of Thomas Carlyle)
James Geddes
Patrick Gibson
Charles Giesecke
John Gordon
Robert Gordon
James Grahame
Robert Grant
James Grierson
John Gunn
George Harvey
William Jory Henwood
J. F. W. Herschel ("Isoperimetrical Problems", "Mathematics")
Samuel Hibbert
John Hodgson
James Innes
David Irving
Alexander Irvine
Josiah Kirby
Robert Kirkwood
Thomas Jackson
Robert Jameson
John Jamieson
George Kellie
Robert Kerr
William Laidlaw
Dionysius Lardner
William Leach
John Lee
John Leslie
Henry Liston
John Lizars
J. G. Lockhart
John Loudon
Joseph Lowe
Robert Lundie
Robert Lyall
A. Macarthur
Charles Mackenzie
George Mackenzie
James Macdonald
Archduke Maximilian
Mr. Maclaurin
J. R. MacCulloch
John MacCulloch
William Memes
J. Morell
Walter Morison
Lockhart Muirhead
William Muller
John Murray
Hugh Murray
Thomas Murray
Andrew Mylne
John Narien
James Nicol
Patrick Neill
Peter Nicholson
Alexander Nimmo
Hans Christian Ørsted
George Peacock
William Pearson
Alexander Peterkin
John Pond
Richard Poole (wrote on "Language", "Mind", "Philology" and "Philosophy")
William Percivall
John Ramsay
William Ramsay
Thomas Reid
William Ritchie
Abraham Robertson
John Robison
William Scoresby
Alexander Scott
John Corse Scott
Robert Eden Scott
James Simpson
Rev. W. Singer
J. C. Simonde de Sismondi
James Skene
Thomas Somerville
Robert Stevenson
William Stevenson, (the father of Elizabeth Gaskell; article "Chivalry" out of a total of around 50)
Andrew Mitchell Thomson, (part-owner)
John Thomson
Thomas Traill
Rev. J. M. Turner
Edmund Turrel
William Tytler
Rev. W. Wade
Josiah Walker
William Wallace
James Watt
James Wilson
John Yule

References

Further reading
The following full set of the Scottish printing may be read online here. It does not include any plates.

 v.1 A to Anatomy –  4 parts, 1808, 851pp + list of plates.
 v.2 Comparative Anatomy to Astronomy –  3 parts, 1810, 836pp + list of plates.
 v.3 Astrophanometer to Bosworth – 3 parts, 1810 & 1811, 776pp + list of plates.
 v.4 Botany to Browne – 2 parts, 1811 & 1812, 760 pp + list of plates.
 v.5 Brown to Cheltenham –  2 parts, 1812, 764 + list of plates.
 v.6 Chemistry to Columbo – 2 parts, 1813, pp + list of plates.
 v.7 Columbus to Dividing of Instruments – 2 parts, 1813 & 1814, 761 pp + list of plates.
 v.8 Divination to England – 2 parts, 1814 & 1815, 761 pp + list of plates.
 v.9 England to Fruit – 2 parts, 1815, 764 pp + list of plates.
 v.10 Fuci to Herodotus – 2 parts, 1816, 757 pp + list of plates.
 v.11 Herpetology to Ilay – 2 parts, 1817, pp + list of plates.
 v.12 Ilchester to Light – 2 parts, 1817 & 1818, 746 pp + list of plates.
 v.13 Lighthouse to Medicine – 2 parts, 1818 & 1819, 739 pp + list of plates.
 v.14 Medicine to Muscat – 2 parts, 1820, pp 743 + list of plates.
 v 15 Musci to Organic Remains – 2 parts, 1821 & 1822, 756 pp + list of plates.
 v 16 Orissa to Poland – 2 parts, 1823, 738 pp + list of plates.
 v.17 Polar Regions to Scotland – 2 parts, 1825 & 1826, 679 pp + list of plates.
 v.18 Sculpture to Zurich Machine – 2 parts, 1828 & 1830 847 pp + list of plates.

External links 

Complete First British and First and Second American editions at the Online Books Page

Book series introduced in 1808
Scottish encyclopedias
Scottish books
History of Edinburgh
Culture in Edinburgh
Reference works in the public domain
Publications established in 1808
1808 establishments in Scotland
1808 non-fiction books
William Blackwood books
19th-century encyclopedias
19th-century British literature